The Pauthenier equation states  that the maximum charge accumulated by a particle modelled by a small sphere passing through an electric field is given by:

For conductors, .

For dielectrics:   where  is the relative permittivity.

Low charges on nanoparticles and microparticles are stable over more than 103 second time scales.

References 

Physics theorems